Patrick Joseph Gallacher (17 March 1881 – 8 April 1951) was a Scottish professional footballer who played as an outside forward in the Scottish League for Partick Thistle. He also played in the Southern League for Luton Town and in the Western League for Tottenham Hotspur.

Personal life 
Gallacher served as a private in the 1st and 2nd Football Battalions during the First World War and by May 1917, he was the trainer of the 1st battalion's football team. He served the final six months of the war as an appointed lance corporal in the Rifle Brigade and the Artists Rifles. In later life, Gallacher worked as a groundsman and at Enfield Cable Works. At the time of his death in April 1951, Gallacher lived within sight of White Hart Lane on Trulock Road, Tottenham.

Career statistics

Honours 
Ton Pentre
Welsh League First Division: 1914–15

References

1881 births
1951 deaths
Scottish military personnel
Scottish footballers
Scottish Football League players
Tottenham Hotspur F.C. players
Luton Town F.C. players
Partick Thistle F.C. players
Ton Pentre F.C. players
British Army personnel of World War I
Middlesex Regiment soldiers
Southern Football League players
Footballers from Glasgow
Association football outside forwards
Workington A.F.C. players
Barrow A.F.C. players
Rifle Brigade soldiers
London Regiment soldiers
Duntocher Hibernian F.C. players